Message Format Language (MFL) is a BEA proprietary language to describe the layout of binary data, and defines rules to transform the binary data in typed data.

MFL can be used by the Oracle Service Bus (OSB) to assist in the creation of service types as part of service-oriented architecture (SOA) implementations.

External links
Using the AquaLogic Service Bus Console on Oracle's site.

BEA Systems